Barbara Chichiarelli is an Italian actress.

Early life and career 
After graduating from the Terenzio Mamiani classical high school, she left university three exams before graduating in theater (former Department of Arts and Performing Sciences of La Sapienza), she attended the 2007–2009 academic year at the Theater Academy of Rome "Sofia Amendolea" and in 2013 she graduated from the National Academy of Dramatic Art with the essay Days of Darkness, on the homeless in Rome, staged by Gabriele Lavia.

In 2016 she received the UBU New Actor or Actress Award (under 35) together with all the performers of Santa Estasi. Atridi: eight family portraits. She was nominated as Best Supporting Actress at the Nastro d'Argento 2020 for the role of Dalila in the film Bad Tales.

Filmography

Films

Television

References

External links

1985 births
Living people
Italian film actresses
Actresses from Rome
Italian stage actresses
Italian television actresses
Mass media people from Rome
21st-century Italian actresses